Gastrodieae is an orchid tribe in the subfamily Epidendroideae.

Genera
Genera included in Chase et al.'s 2015 classification of orchids:
 Auxopus
 Didymoplexiella
 Didymoplexis
 Gastrodia
 Uleiorchis

Didymoplexiopsis may also belong in the tribe, but is not mentioned by Chase et al.

See also
 Taxonomy of the Orchidaceae

References

External links

 
Epidendroideae tribes